HMNZS Hawea is a Lake-class inshore patrol vessel of the Royal New Zealand Navy. Hawea was constructed between 2004 and 2007, and commissioned on 1 May 2009. She performs border and fisheries protection patrols.

Hawea is the third ship of this name to serve in the Royal New Zealand Navy and is named after Lake Hāwea.

See also
 Patrol boats of the Royal New Zealand Navy

References

External links
 HMNZS Hawea official website

Protector-class inshore patrol vessels
2007 ships
Patrol vessels of New Zealand